Messengers is an American Christian metal band, and they primarily play thrash metal. They come from Dallas, Texas. The band started making music in 2008, and their members are lead vocalist, Chad Paramore, lead guitarist, Chance Paramore, bassists, Thomas Kilgore (TK), Guitarist Andy Rhodes, and drummer, Noah Boyce. The band released an extended play, Anthems, in 2010 with Facedown Records alongside Strike First Records. Later joined by Guitarist Phillip Odom Their second extended play, No Shelter, was released in 2013. They are not to be confused with the UK Prog band, "Messenger", whose demo "Solid Chirps" sounds entirely different.

Background
Messengers is a Christian metal band from Dallas, Texas. Their members are lead vocalist, Chad Paramore, lead guitarist, Chance Paramore, bassists, Thomas Kilgore and Andy Rhodes, and drummer, Noah Boyce. Later joined by Guitarist Phillip Odom

Music history
The band commenced as a musical entity in 2008, with their first release, Anthems, an extended play, that was released by Facedown Records alongside Strike First Records on November 9, 2010. Their second extended play, No Shelter, was independently released, in 2013.

Members
Current members
 Chad Paramore – lead vocals
 Chance Paramore – guitar
 Andy Rhodes – guitar

Discography
EPs
 Anthems (November 9, 2010, Facedown/Strike First)
 No Shelter (2013, Independent)

References

External links
Official website

Musical groups from Dallas
2008 establishments in Texas
Musical groups established in 2008
Facedown Records artists
Strike First Records artists